About Time is the twelfth studio album from the Stranglers and the second one from the Black, Burnel, Greenfield, Roberts and Ellis line-up.  The album was released in 1995 through the When! label. It was co-produced, engineered and mixed by Alan Winstanley, who had worked with the Stranglers on their first four albums (as the engineer on Rattus Norvegicus, No More Heroes and Black and White and producer on The Raven). Nigel Kennedy plays electric violin on "Face", and a string-quartet is used on three of the eleven tracks ("Face", "Still Life" and "Sinister").

"Lies and Deception" was the only single released from the album, reaching No. 94 on the UK Singles Chart, and is one of the few Stranglers songs solely written by drummer Jet Black. Released as a two-CD set, CD1 of "Lies and Deception" was backed with non-album tracks "Swim" and "Cool Danny", CD2 was backed with non-album tracks "Kiss the World Goodbye" and "Bed of Nails".

The album peaked at No. 31 in the UK Albums Chart in May 1995.

Critical reception

AllMusic's Stephen Thomas Erlewine wrote that About Time is a "competent but unexceptional record" that contains "a couple of tough, catchy songs" in "Lies and Deception" and "Golden Boy", but is "largely bogged down by tepid songwriting and undistinguished performances."

Track listing

Personnel
 The Stranglers

 Paul Roberts – lead vocals, percussion, production
 Jean-Jacques Burnel – bass, vocals, production
 John Ellis – guitar, vocals, production
 Dave Greenfield – keyboards, vocals, production
 Jet Black – drums, production

 Additional musicians 
 Nigel Kennedy – violin on track 3
 Susie Elliott – vocals on track 4 and 11 
 Chris Winter – harmonica on track 1
 Gavyn Wright – violin on track 3, 4 and 6
 Wilfred Gibson – violin on track 3, 4 and 6 
 Bob Smissen – viola on track 3, 4 and 6 
 Caroline Dale – cello on track 3, 4 and 6 
 Alex Christaki – string arrangements on track 3, 4 and 6 
 Technical

 Alan Winstanley – production, engineering, mixing
 Simon Dawson  – engineering assistance (Rockfield Studios)
 Andrea Wright  – engineering assistance (Parr Street Studios)
 Lee Phillips – engineering assistance (Westside Studios)
 Tim Young – mastering
 Trevor Dawkins – technical assistance, crowd vocal
 Ray Palmer – front cover image, photography
 Michel Tcherevkoff – front cover image
 Castle Communications PLC – design
 Hugh Gilmour – illustrations

References

1995 albums
The Stranglers albums
Albums produced by Alan Winstanley
Albums recorded at Rockfield Studios